Peter Eriksson (born 6 October 1959) is a 5'9"  Swedish equestrian who's competed at several Summer Olympics. In the 2004 Olympics held in Athens, Greece, Eriksson competed aboard a gray stallion named Cardento, and together they helped the Swedish Equestrian Team win a silver medal in Team Showjumping with their clear round and jump-off time of 45.51.  For the following 2008 Summer Olympics held in Beijing,  Eriksson competed on a dark bay stallion, Jaguar Mail, and placed 32nd overall in Individual Showjumping

References 

1959 births
Living people
Swedish show jumping riders
Swedish male equestrians
Olympic equestrians of Sweden
Equestrians at the 1984 Summer Olympics
Equestrians at the 1992 Summer Olympics
Equestrians at the 1996 Summer Olympics
Equestrians at the 2004 Summer Olympics
Equestrians at the 2008 Summer Olympics
Olympic silver medalists for Sweden
Olympic medalists in equestrian
Medalists at the 2004 Summer Olympics